Alessandro Asinari di San Marzano was an Italian politician, general, and Senator of the Kingdom of Italy

Biography
Born in Turin on March 20, 1830 , Alessandro Asinari of San Marzano enrolled in the Turin military academy leaving it just eighteen with the rank of cavalry lieutenant. In 1848 he took part in the First Italian War of Independence where he distinguished himself particularly in the Battle of Santa Lucia and then took part in the Crimean War in which he was promoted to Lieutenant.

In 1859 he took part in the Second Italian War of Independence, being promoted to Captain and becoming part of the General Staff after the Battle of San Martino where he also earned the silver medal for military valor. After the Battle of Castelfidardo he was promoted to Major for war merits and then fought in the Siege of Gaeta and that of Messina where he obtained the knight's cross of the Military Order of Savoy. In 1866 after the Armistice of Villafranca and the Battle of Custoza, he obtained the cross from Officer of the Military Order of Savoy and promoted to Colonel.

After taking part in the capture of Rome in 1870 , in 1877 he was promoted to Major General, then Lieutenant General in 1883 , until he obtained command of the Alexandria division . In the colonial field he was governor of Massawa in Italian Eritrea from 1887 to 1888 and commander in chief of the great expeditionary force sent to East Africa after the Dogali disaster Battle of Dogali. San Marzano guided his troops with caution and successfully faced the Ethiopian army which eventually had to retreat due to logistical difficulties.

He was Italian Minister of War in the Di Rudinì IV Cabinet, Di Rudinì V Cabinet and Pelloux I Cabinet.

Deputy for two legislatures, he was appointed senator on January 4, 1894 but had to give it up shortly after due to poor health and advanced age. Umberto I , who had him in great esteem, appointed him his secretary in the Order of Saints Maurice and Lazarus and later Vittorio Emanuele III awarded him the collar of the Supreme Order of the Most Holy Annunciation.

He died after a slow illness on February 16, 1906 in Rome.

Awards
Supreme Order of the Most Holy Annunciation, Knight (1901)
Order of Saints Maurice and Lazarus, Knight (1901)
Order of the Crown of Italy, Knight (1901)
Military Order of Savoy
Medal of Military Valor
Maurician medal
Commemorative medal for the campaigns in Africa
Commemorative Medal of the Unity of Italy

Foreign Awards
: Commemorative medal of the 1859 Italian Campaign
: Crimea Medal

References

Bibliography
ASINARI di San Marzano, Alessandro in Dizionario Biografico degli Italiani, vol. 4, Institute of the Italian Encyclopedia , 1962.
Alessandro Asinari di San Marzano, on storia.camera.it, Chamber of Deputies

19th-century Italian politicians
Italian generals
1830 births
1906 deaths
Politicians from Turin
Military personnel from Turin
Recipients of the Silver Medal of Military Valor
People of former Italian colonies
Knights Grand Cross of the Order of Saints Maurice and Lazarus
Officers of the Military Order of Savoy
Military personnel of the Crimean War
People of the First Italian War of Independence
People of the Second Italian War of Independence
People of the Third Italian War of Independence
Members of the Expedition of the Thousand